The 2007 Tri Nations Series was an annual rugby union competition between the national teams of Australia, New Zealand and South Africa. The series began in South Africa on 16 June, with a Test between South Africa and Australia at Newlands, Cape Town and ended on 21 July in Eden Park, Auckland with a Test between New Zealand and Australia. The winners, for the third consecutive year, were New Zealand.

The 2007 series consisted of six matches (two home matches each), three fewer than the 2006 series, because of the 2007 Rugby World Cup which would commence on 7 September. The draw was scheduled to ensure that no team played more than two matches in a row, the early finish allowing each team seven full weeks before the start of the World Cup.

The competition reverted to a nine-Test series from 2008 onwards. Early in 2007, it was thought that there was a chance that  could be admitted to the competition as early as 2008, as it had been reported that the worldwide governing body for rugby union, the International Rugby Board, was brokering a deal for the entry of the Pumas. However, by August of that year, it became clear that the competition would not be expanded while the current media contracts ran; the key contract with News Corporation would not expire until 2010.

The tournament had been put into jeopardy after the Springboks team confirmed they were sending a below strength side for the Australasian leg of the tournament.

Springbok selection controversy 
New Zealand and Australian rugby officials considered on the news of the below strength Springbok team, that they might consider scrapping their remaining fixtures against South Africa but cited that because of many arrangements including broadcasting, stadium and ticket arrangements that it might be too complicated.
The ARU also retracted proposals to continue the series without the Springboks after SARU sent a medical report, citing a sport scientist saying "they (the Springboks) might as well not bother going to the World Cup" if they send top injured players to the remaining games. The match turned out to be much more competitive than many observers had predicted, with South Africa storming to a 17–0 lead in the first 16 minutes before the Wallabies regained their composure to eventually overrun the Boks 25–17.

Standings

Results 
All times are local.

Week 1

Week 2

Week 3

Week 4

Week 5

Week 6

References

External links 
 All Blacks Tri Nations website
 
 Wallabies Tri Nations website

2007
2007 in South African rugby union
2007 in New Zealand rugby union
2007 in Australian rugby union
2007 rugby union tournaments for national teams